The 2021 Arizona Wildcats baseball team represented the University of Arizona during the 2021 NCAA Division I baseball season. The Wildcats played their home games for the 10th season at Hi Corbett Field. The team was coached by Jay Johnson in his 6th season and final season at Arizona. Following the season, Coach Johnson was hired as the head baseball coach at Louisiana State University. The Wildcats ranked 10th in Collegiate Baseball's preseason poll - their highest preseason ranking in any poll since 2013 - and their incoming recruiting class was ranked 4th in the nation by D1Baseball. On May 23, the Wildcats clinched at least a share of the Pac-12 Championship for the first time since the 2012 season that saw the team win the College World Series. Following a 3-11 loss by the Oregon Ducks to the California Golden Bears on May 28, the team clinched their first outright Pac-12 title since 1989. On May 30, Hi Corbett Field was selected as one of the NCAA's 16 postseason Regional sites for the first time since 2012. The following day the Wildcats were selected as the tournaments No. 5 overall seed - their first selection as a top 8 seed since the implementation of the current seeding system in 1999 - marking their first postseason appearance since 2017. On June 6, the Wildcats defeated UC Santa Barbara 5-2 to win the Tucson Regional and advance to their first Super Regional since 2016 when the team forged their way to the College World Series finals. The Wildcats would go on to defeat Ole Miss 2 games to 1, to advance to their 18th College World Series appearance all-time.  They subsequently were eliminated in two games, losing to the defending champion from 2019, No. 4 seed Vanderbilt as well as Stanford.

Previous season 
The Wildcats began the 2020 season 10–5, good for a tie for third-place in the Pac-12 prior to the NCAA's decision to cancel the season on March 12 due to the COVID-19 pandemic. Due to the season's cancellation, all Division I college baseball players were granted an extra year of eligibility.

Personnel

Roster

Coaches

Opening day

Schedule and results

Tucson Regional

Tucson Super Regional

College World Series

Rankings

2021 MLB draft

Notes

References 

Arizona
Arizona Wildcats baseball seasons
Arizona baseball
Arizona
College World Series seasons
Pac-12 Conference baseball champion seasons